The Florence Crittenton Home is a historic house at 3600 West 11th Street in Little Rock, Arkansas.  Its main block is a two-story brick hip-roof structure, to which similarly styled ells have been added to the right and rear.  Its front facade is symmetrical, with a central entrance sheltered by a Colonial Revival portico supported by grouped columns and topped by a painted iron railing.  The house was built in 1917 to a design by the architectural firm Thompson & Harding.

The house was listed on the National Register of Historic Places in 1982.

See also
National Register of Historic Places listings in Little Rock, Arkansas

References

Houses on the National Register of Historic Places in Arkansas
Colonial Revival architecture in Arkansas
Houses completed in 1917
Houses in Little Rock, Arkansas
National Register of Historic Places in Little Rock, Arkansas